The 2016 Balkan Athletics Championships was the 75th edition of the annual track and field competition for athletes from the Balkans, organised by Balkan Athletics. It was held at Stadionul Nicolae Dobrin in Pitești, Romania on 25 and 26 June. The host nation Romania won the most titles at the competition, with eight, and Turkey won with most medals overall, at 23.

Results

Men

Women

Medal table

References

Results
75th Balkan Athletics Championships. Balkan Athletics. Retrieved 2019-08-03.

2016
Sport in Pitești
International athletics competitions hosted by Romania
Balkan Athletics Championships
Balkan Athletics Championships
Balkan Athletics Championships